Rizari  is a village in the municipality of Edessa, Greece.

Notable people
Marietta Chrousala (1983 - ) - fashion model and television presenter

References 

Populated places in Pella (regional unit)
Edessa, Greece